The abbreviation NCFC may refer to:

Football (soccer) clubs
Newport County A.F.C.
Nairn County F.C.
Norwich City F.C.
North Carolina FC
North Carolina FC Youth (NCFC Youth)
Notts County F.C.

Other uses
 Neuro-cardio-facial-cutaneous syndromes

See also
NCAFC (disambiguation)